Battle of Makwanpur may refer to:
 Battle of Makwanpur (1762), a battle between the Gorkha Kingdom and the Kingdom of Makwanpur
 Battle of Makwanpur (1763), a battle between the Gorkha Kingdom and the Nawab of Bengal
 Battle of Makwanpur (1816), a battle between the Kingdom of Nepal and the East India Company